Mark Yale Harris (born 1936) is an American sculptor, and a former businessperson. He working primarily in stone and bronze for his art. Beginning his professional life in the business sector, in 1972 Harris co-founded and was Executive Vice President of Red Roof Inns. In 1991, he founded AmeriSuites Hotels, where he served as CEO. He lives and works in the Roaring Fork Valley region of Colorado.

Early life
Harris was born in Buffalo, New York in 1936. He attended the business program at Ohio State University (OSU), earning a B.S.S. degree in 1961.

Business career
Harris worked for more than 30 years in hospitality/urban development. In 1972, he partnered with Jim Trueman, also an OSU alumnus, to co-found Red Roof Inn in Columbus, Ohio. The company opened over 300 properties primarily in the Midwest, South, and Eastern United States. In 1991, Harris founded Amerisuites. Within a short time, the company opened approximately 100 locations throughout the United States. In the late ‘90s, he sold this business to The Blackstone Group.

Based in Austin, Texas at the time, Harris chaired the Urban Land Institute, Austin District council 1998 to 2000, which led to his chairmanship of the 2nd Annual Smart Growth Conference, also in Austin, in 1999.

Early artistic work and education
While Harris sold his main business in 1996, he continued with business projects while learning to carve stone. This became a passion after taking an alabaster carving class in Austin, Texas.

Harris then sought out a mentor in Aleut sculptor Bill Prokopiof, whose work he had long admired and collected. The artist invited Harris to work alongside him in his studio in Santa Fe, New Mexico. Nez Perce sculptor Doug Hyde took him under his wing. Both sculptors had been among the protégés of Native American sculptor Allan Houser (Chiricahua/Apache). Houser was known for his willingness to share his knowledge and Prokopiof and Hyde followed his lead.

While beginning to find a measure of recognition for his work, Harris continued to challenge himself and expand his creative development. Several intensive workshops contributed to his process and skill, including studies with singer-songwriter and multidisciplinary artist Terry Allen, Jo Harvey Allen, James Surls, Lincoln Fox and John Forno at the Anderson Ranch Arts Center and the Marble Institute of Colorado.

Artwork

Stone 
Harris began to work in alabaster, marble and limestone. Regarding his work, Harris said, “The motivation for me is to try and interpret an emotion, be it human or animal, within my media. In my case, attempting to blend form, figure, emotion and gesture often result in a figurative abstraction.” Of his intentions, he stated, “Life has a hard, aggressive side, as does much of my work, represented by rigid, angular lines. However, the soft side is also apparent, visible as curves and soft forms. My evolving body of work evokes this duality.”

Monumental bronze 

In 2006, the artist enlarged a tabletop-sized maquette into monumental proportions. He found that some pieces work best on an intimate scale, while others require sheer size. He formed large works that lent themselves more to bronze. Recent instruction at CREATE Center for the Arts introduced Harris to the use of the virtual reality program Oculus as an adjunct to his existing practice of drawing preliminary sketches before working directly with the stone. He sponsored a lecture and demonstration series, Untapped Potential, VR for Artists, at Carbondale Arts and The Art Base.

Animal sculpture

Though known for his figurative works, Harris also has a significant portfolio of animal sculptures. The psychological overtones of his figurative works give way to moments in time and the whimsy of nature. Harris captures the lumbering bear’s walk, the graceful leap of fish from the water, the lazy heaviness of cattle.

Selected exhibitions

Harris' art is represented by over twenty galleries in the US and UK. He has appeared in solo, museum and international exhibitions, including the Royal Academy of London, United Kingdom; Marin MOCA; High Desert Museum; Ventana Fine Art, Santa Fe, New Mexico; National Museum of Wildlife Art; Orange County Center for Contemporary Art; Royal Scottish Academy, Edinburgh, United Kingdom; National Sculpture Society, New York, New York; Millicent Rogers Museum, Taos, New Mexico; The Wildlife Experience Museum; Peace Arch Park; Museum of the Southwest; Palm Springs Art Museum; Cheyenne Frontier Days Old West Museum; Yellowstone Art Museum; and the Austin Museum of Art.

Recognition

 Columbus Museum of Art’s Decorator Show House - Columbus, Ohio (2015)
 Second Place, Sculpture - Museum of the Southwest, Group Exhibition - Midland, Texas (2009)
 Best of Show: Second Place, 3D Mixed Media Division - Museum of the Southwest, Spring Juried Art Exhibition - Midland, Texas (2007)
 Roswell Museum, Sculpture - sponsor, Roswell Chamber of Commerce - Roswell, New Mexico (2002) 
 First Place, Elisabeth Ney Museum Sculpture Show - Austin, Texas (1996)

Organizations

 International Sculpture Center
 Carbondale Public Arts Commission (Colorado), former Chair
 New Mexico Sculptors Guild, former Vice-Chair
 National Sculpture Society Texas Society of Sculptors
 Texas Fine Arts Association
 Friends of Contemporary Art Santa Fe
 Austin Visual Artist’s Association
 Society of Animal Artists

References

Further reading
 "Figurative Abstractions: Mark Yale Harris," MVIBE Magazine, June 2021, https://mvibemagazine.vsble.me/issue/28281449
 "Stone Sculpture Artist Preserves The Beauty of Passing Sensory Experiences," Obsessed with Art, 2021, https://obsessedwithart.com/stone-sculpture-artist-mark-yale-harris/
 "From suites to sculpture: Creativity a constant throughout alumnus’ career," https://fisher.osu.edu/news/suites-sculpture-creativity-a-constant-throughout-alumnus-career
Mark Yale Harris interview, Art World Innovators, University of Manitoba, Canada, https://umfm.com/programming/broadcast/art-world-innovators-march-27-2019
 "Mark Yale Harris," Aji Magazine, Issue 9, Nov 2018, http://www.ajimagazine.com/uploads/2/2/2/8/22289112/ajimagazinefall2018issue9_1.pdf
 "Mark Harris," Magazine 43, https://markyaleharris.com/wp-content/uploads/2018/09/Magazine43Issue3Spring2018-smaller.pdf
 Townsend, Jen & Renée Zettle-Sterling. Cast: Art and Objects Made Using Humanity’s Most Transformational Process. Atglen, Pennsylvania: Schiffer Publishing, 2017
 O'Hern, John. "Advocacy for the Arts," American Art Collector, June 2016, p. 48
 Kracun, Danijela and Charles McFadden. Contemporary Sculptors: 84 International Artists. Atglen, Pennsylvania: Schiffer Publishing, 2012

External links
 
 
 

1936 births
Living people
American male sculptors
Ohio State University alumni
American hoteliers
People from Buffalo, New York